They Stooge to Conga is a 1943 short subject directed by Del Lord starring American slapstick comedy team The Three Stooges (Moe Howard, Larry Fine and Curly Howard). It is the 67th entry in the series released by Columbia Pictures starring the comedians, who released 190 shorts for the studio between 1934 and 1959.

Plot
The Stooges are incompetent and dim-witted repairmen fixing the doorbell of a large house, which, unbeknownst to them, is the secret headquarters of a group of Nazi agents, headed by the ruthless Hans (Vernon Dent). They manage to disembowel not only the wiring of the walls and destroy most of the house as they work but also totally confuse the city telephone wire system! Moe and Larry then subdue Hans and his Japanese cohort, assume their wardrobes (emulating Adolf Hitler and Hideki Tojo) and ultimately sink their submarine by remote control. With the spies trapped, the Stooges proceed to beat them all up.

Cast

Credited
 Moe Howard as Moe
 Larry Fine as Larry
 Curly Howard as Curly

Uncredited
 Vernon Dent as Nazi Spy Leader 
 Dudley Dickerson as Chef 
 Fern Emmett as Marsha 
 Stanley Brown as Bomber pilot
 Frederick Giermann as U-Boat captain
 Robert Stevens as Telephone Customer
 Lloyd Bridges as Telephone Customer
 John Tyrrell as Telephone Customer / Nazi spy 
 Christine McIntyre as Female Telephone Customer 
 Julie Duncan as Female Telephone Customer
 Eddie Laughton as Radio announcer (voice)
 Charles Sherlock as 1st saboteur
 Dick Jensen as 2nd saboteur
 Anna Woods as Mlle. Zora
 Donald Will as Japanese officer

Production notes
They Stooge to Conga was filmed May 6–9, 1942. The film title is a parody of the 18th-century play She Stoops to Conquer.

The doorbell repair segment was reworked with Shemp Howard in 1952's Listen, Judge. The footage of the submarine jumping out of the water was recycled from Three Little Sew and Sews. A similar gag was used in the 2012 film The Three Stooges where Larry (Sean Hayes) is wearing a sandwich board.

A young Lloyd Bridges appears as "Telephone Customer #2" in one of his last uncredited roles.

This is the third Stooges short where Moe plays a parody of Adolf Hitler; the first two, with Moe portraying "Moe Hailstone" as the Hitler parody role in both, were You Nazty Spy! and its sequel I'll Never Heil Again, neither of which had any connection to this short.

This entry also marked the second time Curly says the word, "sabatoogie", a mispronouncing of "sabotage"; the first time was in 1942's Loco Boy Makes Good.

Violence
They Stooge to Conga has been frequently ranked as the most violent Stooge film of the Curly Howard era (1934–1947). DVD Talk critic Stuart Galbraith IV writes that, in its brief 15½ minutes, the film "offers several startling moments, none more gleefully sadistic as when Curly, scaling an electrical pole, within a few seconds manages to puncture the top of Moe's head, an eye, and an ear with a climbing spike, all with cringe-inducing 'ker-CHUNK' sound effects." Moe also gets pulled through lath and plaster, with a real wooden pillar unintentionally landing on his neck. Curly gets his share of abuse, via electrocution, falling off a telephone pole, severe nose twisting, and getting singed via an acetylene torch.

Although Columbia short subject head/director Jules White was known for the use of extreme violence in his films, They Stooge to Conga was directed by Del Lord. "We had trouble pulling Moe all the way through the wall," White later recalled. "Since Moe was a full grown man, we weakened the wall and the wood inside and then replastered the wall."

Notable violent gags
When the trio first enter the house, Moe and Larry try to enter the house simultaneously. They are wedged in the doorway, and get thrust out when Curly comes up from behind with the point of an anvil as a gouge.
When Curly is pulling a wire out of a wall he pulls out a ringing phone. He answers it, says "This line is busy" and throws it away, hitting Moe in the head. Moe throws it back in retaliation, hitting Curly in the head as Moe smiles smugly.
When Moe is pulled through the wall by Larry and Curly, an actual 2x4 made of solid wood crashed onto Moe's neck.
When Moe twists Curly's nose with a tool, he uses a grinding wheel to file it back into shape.
As Moe and Larry assist Curly up a telephone pole, Curly accidentally impales Moe in his scalp, eye and ear with a climbing spike on the bottom of his shoe. These spike gags are almost certainly the main source of the short's reputation as excessively violent.
When Curly is halfway up the telephone pole, Moe burns the rear end of Curly with a flame torch to get him all the way up.
After Curly drops a wrench, it lands on Moe's head, bouncing into Larry's hand. Moe uses the wrench on Larry's nose while hitting him in the throat.
Curly shocks himself when he tries to straighten a wire.  He shocks himself again when he goes to test the connection.
When Curly gets zapped via several telephone pole wires, he loses his grip and falls to the sidewalk, landing on Moe and Larry below.
While Curly is "charged like a battery," Moe places a light bulb in Curly's ear, which lights up. To short him out, Larry places a screwdriver in Curly's opposite ear, bursting the light bulb. (This gag of being charged like a battery was later reused in The Addams Family (new series) Comedy with "Uncle Fester" as the "battery"!)
As Curly is sliding on electrical wires, he gets a shock, which pushes him through an open window.
As the Nazi spies' cook (Dudley Dickerson) is talking on the phone, the phone explodes in his face due to Curly's manipulating the electrical wires. The startled cook then backs away from the phone, right into an open waffle iron. The iron closes on the cook's buttocks, leading the cook to think he is being attacked by someone.
When Moe takes a hammer, he hits Larry from behind, then thrusts it into Curly's mouth. Curly, in turn, bonks Moe with his own hammer 20 times in rapid succession.

References

External links
 
 
They Stooge to Conga at threestooges.net

1943 films
1943 comedy films
Cultural depictions of Adolf Hitler
The Three Stooges films
American black-and-white films
American World War II films
Films directed by Del Lord
Columbia Pictures short films
American comedy short films
1940s English-language films
1940s American films